The 2013 6 Hours of Bahrain was an endurance auto race held at the Bahrain International Circuit in Sakhir, Bahrain on 30 November 2013. The race was the eighth and final showdown of the 2013 FIA World Endurance Championship season. The race was won by Sébastien Buemi, Stéphane Sarrazin and Anthony Davidson driving the No.8 Toyota TS030 Hybrid of Toyota Racing.

Qualifying

Qualifying result
Pole position winners in each class are marked in bold.

Race

Race result
Class winners in bold. Cars failing to complete 70% of winner's distance marked as Not Classified (NC).

References

8 Hours of Bahrain
Bahrain
6 Hours